Ursuline Academy is a private school in Wilmington, Delaware, which offers Early Childhood (Montessori (ages 3–5) and Kindergarten) and elementary (grades 1–5) school for both girls and boys, Middle (Grades 6–8), and Upper (Grades 9–12) school classes for girls. Established in 1893 by the Ursulines, it is an independent, Catholic, college-preparatory school.

Notable alumni
Erin Arvedlund, financial journalist
Valerie Biden Owens, political strategist, sister of President Joe Biden
Vera Gilbride Davis, Delaware politician
Elena Delle Donne, WNBA player for the Washington Mystics; played collegiately at the University of Delaware
Aubrey Plaza, actress in Parks and Recreation and other movies
Marjorie Rendell, federal judge and former first lady for the State of Pennsylvania 
Val Whiting, former WNBA player; athletic hall of fame inductee at Stanford University

References

External links
 

Private elementary schools in Delaware
Private middle schools in Delaware
High schools in New Castle County, Delaware
Catholic secondary schools in Delaware
Girls' schools in Delaware
Buildings and structures in Wilmington, Delaware
Educational institutions established in 1893
Schools in New Castle County, Delaware
Ursuline schools
1893 establishments in Delaware
Roman Catholic Diocese of Wilmington